The Future Attack Reconnaissance Aircraft (FARA) program was initiated by the United States Army in 2018 to develop a successor to the Bell OH-58 Kiowa scout helicopter as part of the Future Vertical Lift program. The OH-58 was retired in 2014; three prior programs for a successor were cancelled prior to reaching production: Light Helicopter Experimental (1982–2004, resulting in the Boeing–Sikorsky RAH-66 Comanche), Armed Reconnaissance Helicopter (2004–06, resulting in the Bell ARH-70 Arapaho), and Armed Aerial Scout (2012–13, evaluating commercial off-the-shelf designs).

Design contracts for FARA candidates were awarded in April 2019 to five manufacturers: AVX Aircraft (in partnership with L3Harris Technologies), Bell Helicopter, Boeing, Karem Aircraft, and Sikorsky Aircraft (owned by Lockheed Martin). In March 2020, the designs from Bell and Sikorsky were selected to proceed to Phase 2 of the competition; this phase will end with a government flight test evaluation no later than the fall of 2023. Selection of a design for production is scheduled for 2028, but may occur sooner.

Design goals
U.S. Army officials called the FARA its "'knife-fighter' of future Army Aviation capabilities", providing maximum performance in a small package. Per the initial request for proposal, FARA candidates will use the engine selected under the Improved Turbine Engine Program (ITEP). Performance goals were set with few restrictions aside from maximum dimensions not to exceed  for both rotor diameter and fuselage width. The proposed FARA aircraft must integrate government furnished equipment (weapons and engine) with an affordability goal, and should meet desired range, endurance, and payload targets.

Competition history
The OH-58 was retired without a clear successor in 2014; three successive programs were cancelled without reaching production; although the Army intended to perform a service life extension program for the OH-58 fleet in 2013, cuts to the defense budget forced its retirement. In lieu of the OH-58, the Army has used Boeing AH-64 Apache attack helicopters paired with AAI RQ-7 Shadow drones in the armed reconnaissance role.

FARA is part of the Future Vertical Lift program and its procurement is largely modeled on the Joint Multi-Role technology demonstration program. The US Army released a draft solicitation on June 22, 2018 for reconnaissance helicopter proposals, with the intent to have two flying prototype designs by 2023, which will compete for the final award. On October 3, 2018, the Army released its formal request for proposal and outlined its proposed schedule:
 Jun 2019: Award four to six initial candidate design contracts
 Mar 2020: Choose two of the initial candidate designs to be developed into flying prototypes
 Nov 2022: Fly-off competition to be held between the two prototype designs
 Future: Award contract based on results from fly-off competition

The FARA procurement, headed by Brigadier General Wally Rugen, would disburse $15 million per candidate selected in the first development phase. The two prototype candidates would each receive $735 million to build flying aircraft for the competition. In April 2019, the Army awarded candidate design contracts to five manufacturers: AVX/L3, Bell, Boeing, Karem, and Sikorsky. MD Helicopters, which was developing a variant of its MD902 Explorer with a wing to meet the Army's requirements, was not selected for the candidate design phase.

Initial candidate designs

AVX/L3
The AVX/L3 candidate design was unveiled at the summit of the Army Aviation Association of America in April 2019. The design, which AVX/L3 call the Compound Coaxial Helicopter (CCH), uses a side-by-side cockpit with main compound coaxial rotors; ducted fans at the tail provide both forward and reverse thrust.

Bell

The CEO of Textron, Bell's parent company, stated that its FARA candidate design would be based on technology developed for the 525, rather than a further development of the V-280 tiltrotor. In October 2019, Bell announced the 360 Invictus as its FARA candidate design, a winged helicopter with a single rotor and ducted tail rotor.

Boeing
, Boeing had not released details on its FARA candidate aircraft to the public. A Boeing executive declined to state if the recently unveiled Compound Apache would form the basis for the company's FARA candidate design. On 13 February 2020, Boeing released a teaser video and images of its FARA design. It offers stealth features. More details of the Boeing FARA design were revealed on 3 March 2020; it is a three-rotor compound helicopter with tandem seating.

Karem
Karem Aircraft announced in July 2019 it had partnered with Northrop Grumman and Raytheon to design its FARA candidate aircraft. On 16 October 2019, Karem unveiled its AR40 design, a compound helicopter with a rigid main rotor, a swiveling tail rotor/pusher propeller, and a pivoting wing.

Sikorsky

Sikorsky stated that its FARA candidate design would incorporate the compound coaxial rotors and pusher propeller design used on its Sikorsky X2 and S-97 Raider; the S-97 had initially been developed for the Armed Aerial Scout program. In October 2019, Sikorsky unveiled the Sikorsky Raider X, a scaled-up version of the S-97 Raider designed to accommodate the General Electric T901-900 turboshaft engine, which won the ITEP competition in February 2019.

Finalists
On 25 March 2020, the US Army selected Bell and Sikorsky to move forward to develop flying prototypes. In May 2022, budget documents showed that flight testing would be delayed to Fiscal Year 2024, which starts in October 2023. Deliveries of the GE T901, developed under ITEP, were delayed until November 2022; the T901 will be installed in the FARA prototypes.

References

External links
 Army could select new Future Attack Reconnaissance Aircraft by 2020
 Future Attack Reconnaissance Aircraft Competitive Prototype (FARA CP): draft solicitation
 Future Attack Reconnaissance Aircraft Competitive Prototype (FARA CP): final solicitation & award

Military helicopters
Military aircraft procurement programs of the United States